Great Phone Calls Featuring Neil Hamburger is a 1992 album by alternative comedian Neil Hamburger. It was originally released by Amarillo Records in 1992 and then re-issued on Ipecac Recordings in 2000 with 7 extra tracks.

Track listing

"I'm In Your Band" (5:56)
"Cancel It!" (0:23)
"Hijinx" (4:16)
"Hijinx and a Child" (2:48)
"A Score to Settle" (2:14)
"Blood Pizza" (1:03)
"Graduate of Yaoo" (3:16)
"(Write My) Name on the Toilet" (2:00)
"You're Not Good Enough" (2:40)
"A Special Request" (2:45)
"Rock & Roll" (3:08)
"Pickle Potato" (1:45)
"The Man from Hott" (1:30)
"Music of the Night" (featuring Mike Patton) (1:03)
"A Nationally-Known Comedian" (6:16)
"I Got Shot" (1:13)
"Nude Models" (0:33)
"MHC" (1:10)
"Nobody Seems to Love Me" (1:07)
"SF Hotline" (1:17)
"Friends" (1:06)
"Pablo Cruise Fan Club" (1:05)

References

Gregg Turkington albums
Ipecac Recordings albums
1992 albums
Prank call albums
Amarillo Records albums